Schultz's rule is a rule developed by Adolph Hans Schultz, declaring a relationship between the first tooth eruption of the molar versus the permanent teeth and the progress or aging of its carrier. It states that species that live longer have more wear on deciduous teeth and as a result start replacing them relatively early in life. Which is an indicator for examining fossil data. According to research, Myotragus balearicus follows Schultz's Rule.

See also 
 Diphyodont
 Polyphyodont
 Tooth development

References

Further reading 
 
 

Tooth development
Animal anatomy
Paleontological concepts and hypotheses